Söderström is a surname of Swedish origin, and Søderstrøm a surname of Norwegian origin. Both mean "south stream; or, river"; and both are commonly anglicized as Soderstrom or Soederstroem. People with those surnames include:
 Bruno Söderström (18811969), Swedish track and field athlete
 Christian Söderström (born 1980), Swedish ice hockey player
 Dan Söderström (born 1948), Swedish ice hockey player
 Elisabeth Söderström (19272009), Swedish soprano noted for her performances of both opera and song
 Fredrik Söderström (born 1973), Swedish footballer
 Gustaf Söderström (18651958), Swedish athlete who won a gold medal at the 1900 Olympic Games
 Hans Söderström (born 1957), Swedish curler
 Jonatan Söderström (AKA "Cactus", active from 2008), Swedish independent video game developer
 Judy Soderstrom (born 1942), American politician and businesswoman
 Marit Söderström (born 1962), Swedish sailor who competed in the 1988 Summer Olympics
 Mark Soderstrom (born 1970), Australian footballer and television presenter
 Ove Söderström, (born 1939), Swedish curler
 Per Søderstrøm (born 1943), Norwegian handball player who competed in the 1972 Summer Olympics
 Reuben G. Soderstrom (18881970), American labor union leader in Illinois 
 Steve Soderstrom (born 1972), American baseball player
 Thomas Robert Soderstrom (193687), American agrostologist
 Tim Söderström (born 1994), Swedish footballer
 Tommy Söderström (born 1969), Swedish ice hockey goaltender
 Tryston Soderstrom (born 2001), American pole dancer
 Tyler Soderstrom (born 2001), American baseball player
 Ulf Söderström (born 1972), Swedish ice hockey player

See also 
 Victor Söderström (disambiguation)
Söderström, a river in central Stockholm.
 Bouteloua, a genus of plants formerly known as Soderstromia
 Söderströms Förlag, a Finnish Swedish-language publishing company

References

Swedish-language surnames